Gretl Aicher (July 19, 1928 – March 14, 2012) was the Artistic Director of the Salzburg Marionette Theatre.

Background
Gretl Aicher took over the position of Artistic Director of the famous Salzburg Marionette Theatre in 1977 on the death of the former director, Hermann Aicher. With her father she has been linked for a considerable time with the success of the company. Her grandfather, Anton Aicher founded the company in 1913. To mark the 70th birthday of Gretl Aicher and the 85th anniversary of the Salzburg Marionette Theatre, a special exhibition of marionettes was opened at the Salzburg Hohensalzburg Fortress.

Aicher has commented on her last passion with puppetry,

References

Books and articles

External links
- Salzburg Marionette Theatre homepage of the Salzburg Marionette Theatre - available in English and German

Austrian puppeteers
Austrian theatre directors
Austrian designers
Performing arts presenters
People from Salzburg
1928 births
2012 deaths